Harriet Tubman National Historical Park is a US historical park in Auburn and Fleming, New York, associated with the life of Harriet Tubman. It comprises three properties: the Harriet Tubman Home for the Aged, in Auburn; the nearby Harriet Tubman Residence (just across the city/town line in Fleming); and the Thompson A.M.E. Zion Church in Auburn. They are located at 180 and 182 South Street, and 90 Franklin Street, respectively. The Zion Church unit is administered by the National Park Service (NPS), while the South Street properties, including a historic barn and a visitor center, are jointly managed and operated by both the NPS and the Harriet Tubman Home, Inc. The church also works with the NPS in park operations. The Harriet Tubman Grave in nearby Fort Hill Cemetery is not part of the park.

The group of properties also makes up a National Historic Landmark, the first parcel having been declared in 1974, with two others added in 2001.

Tubman was a major conductor on the Underground Railroad, and known as "the Moses of her people". She moved to Auburn with her parents after spending eight to ten years in St. Catharines, Ontario. She continued working as a suffragist, and worked all her life to care for others who were unable to care for themselves.

The Harriet Tubman Home for the Aged is the house where she fulfilled her dream of opening a home for indigent and elderly African-Americans. In 1911 she was admitted there, herself, and remained there until her death in 1913.

The Harriet Tubman Residence was Tubman's home during much of the time she lived in Auburn, from 1859 through 1913. The land was sold to her in 1859 by then-Senator William H. Seward.

Thompson A.M.E. Zion Church is an African Methodist Episcopal Zion Church where Harriet Tubman attended services. Later in her life, she deeded the Home for the Aged to the church, for it to manage after her death.

History of the Home

Harriet Tubman moved herself and her parents from St.Catherines, Ontario to Auburn, NY in 1857. They relocated into a brick home on the outskirts of Auburn located at 180 South Street she had purchased from an acquaintance William H. Seward, which then was an illegal transaction. Seward's deal along with being illegal was fair priced with flexible terms, this probably stemmed from their friendship from the Underground Railroad.

In 1896, Tubman purchased a 25-acre parcel from a property next door, 182 South Street, for $1,450, this land would later become the Home for the Aged.

In 1903, she was forced to give it up because she could not afford to pay for it anymore. She donated it to the African Methodist Episcopal Zion Church (AME Zion Church) that same year  with an agreement that they would continue to run the Home for the Aged. She was an active member of the AME Zion Church and supported the construction of the Thompson AME Church building as well.

In 1908, after working for 5 years to equip the staff the house become the Harriet Tubman Home for the Elderly in which Harriet Tubman also lived. In 1911, her health would not allow that anymore and she later became a patient herself until 1913 when she died. The Home for the Elderly continued to function for a couple more years but then closed. The house became vacant in 1928 and was demolished in 1944 after being vacant for nearly 16 years.

In 1953, the house was rebuilt and restored in memory of Tubman's life and accomplishments. This was all organized by the AME Zion Church whom Tubman had given the property to over 50 years before. Since 1953, there has been 2 more buildings added to the property due to the transitions of it becoming a historic site, national park and public attraction.

The site received a prestigious Save America's Treasures grant in 2000.

In 2017, multiple sites related to Harriet Tubman had been labeled part of the National Historic Park; these locations are:

Home for the Aged 	180 South Street Auburn, NY 13021

Residence 		182 South Street Auburn, NY 13021

AME Zion Church         33 Parker Street Auburn, NY 13021

National Historical Parks

The park in Auburn was established on January 10, 2017, at a signing ceremony at the United States Department of the Interior in Washington, DC. Interior Secretary Sally Jewell was joined by New York lawmakers, local and federal officials in creating the 51st National Historical Park and the 414th US national park system unit. The park will focus on the later years of Tubman's life.

The park joins another NPS area in Maryland in interpreting the life of Tubman. Harriet Tubman Underground Railroad National Historical Park includes her birthplace and Underground Railroad routes in three counties of Maryland's Eastern Shore. This sister park in Maryland was established first, on December 19, 2014, incorporating much of the previously authorized Harriet Tubman Underground Railroad National Monument, which had been designated in 2013.

Tubman moved to Auburn, New York, after spending eight to 10 years in St. Catharines, Ontario, from which she also moved her parents. Tubman's life is commemorated in the Ontario city at Salem Chapel National Historic Site, the church she frequented, and still home to an active congregation. Federal plaques there include one which bears witness to her designation as a National Historic Person.

See also
List of Underground Railroad sites
 Harriet Tubman Underground Railroad National Historical Park in Maryland
 Harriet Tubman Underground Railroad Scenic Byway (Maryland)
 Harriet Tubman Underground Railroad Byway (Delaware)

References

External links

Official website at the National Park Service
Harriett Tubman at NY History
Harriet Tubman Home - visiting information
Aboard the Underground Railroad: Harriet Tubman Home for the Aged, Harriet Tubman Residence, and Thompson AME Zion Church, at National Park Service
Places Where Women Made History: Harriet Tubman Home for the Aged, at National Park Service

Houses on the National Register of Historic Places in New York (state)
Properties of religious function on the National Register of Historic Places in New York (state)
Residential buildings on the National Register of Historic Places in New York (state)
National Historic Landmarks in New York (state)
Houses in Cayuga County, New York
Museums in Cayuga County, New York
Home for the Aged
Tubman
African-American museums in New York (state)
Tubman
Memorials to Harriet Tubman
National Register of Historic Places in Cayuga County, New York
Protected areas established in 2017
2017 establishments in New York (state)
National Historical Parks of the United States
Underground Railroad in New York (state)
African-American historic house museums